Lonsdale Road Reservoir (also the Leg of Mutton Reservoir or Leg o' Mutton Reservoir) is a disused reservoir in Barnes in the London Borough of Richmond upon Thames. It is an 8.2 hectare local nature reserve and Site of Borough Importance for Nature Conservation, Grade 1, owned and managed by Richmond upon Thames London Borough Council.

History
The reservoir was built in 1838 and decommissioned in 1960. Developers proposed to build housing and a shopping centre on the site, but this was strongly opposed by local residents. They suggested that it should become a nature reserve instead, and their proposal was accepted. The council purchased the area from Thames Water in 1970 and in 1990 it was designated a local nature reserve.

Ecology
Breeding birds include pochards, which are nationally scarce, mute swans, great crested grebe and grey herons. There are many more waterfowl in the winter. The site is also important for bats, and amphibians include the protected great crested newt. Aquatic plants include bogbean and frogbit, both of which are rare in London.

Access
There is a mile-long perimeter path round the reservoir, which can be accessed from the Thames Path, Ferry Lane and Lonsdale Road.

References

Barnes, London
Nature reserves in the London Borough of Richmond upon Thames
Local nature reserves in Greater London